Jadon Malik Sancho (born 25 March 2000) is an English professional footballer who plays as a winger for  club Manchester United and the England national team. Considered one of the best young players in the world, he is known for his trickery, game intelligence and use of feints in one-on-one situations.

Previously a youth player with Watford and Manchester City, Sancho signed his first senior contract with Borussia Dortmund in 2017. In his second season, he established himself as a first-team regular and was named in the 2018–19 Bundesliga Team of the Season. Ahead of the 2019–20 season, Sancho won his first trophy following the DFL-Supercup victory over Bayern Munich. He was named runner-up in both the Golden Boy and Kopa Trophy awards in 2019. Sancho returned to England to sign for Manchester United in 2021.

Sancho was part of the England youth team that won the 2017 FIFA U-17 World Cup and made his debut for the senior team in 2018.

Early life
Sancho was born in Camberwell, Greater London to parents from Trinidad and Tobago. He was raised in Kennington, in South London. He became friends with fellow aspiring footballer Reiss Nelson, who lived nearby, after they played together in youth tournaments. Growing up, he was a Chelsea fan, and idolised Ronaldinho and Frank Lampard.

Club career

Early career

Sancho joined Watford at the age of seven. Due to issues with commuting across London to the club's academy, he moved into accommodation provided by Watford and began attending their partner school Harefield Academy as a boarder, aged 11. At the age of 14 he told his Watford under-15s coach about his intention to play for England.

At the age of 14, he moved to Manchester City in March 2015 for an initial fee of £66,000 under the Elite Player Performance Plan, potentially rising to £500,000 with add ons. Sancho continued to impress in the City academy and was one of a trio of players that City chairman, Khaldoon Al Mubarak, said would be fast tracked into the senior set up in May 2017. In July, Sancho was omitted from City's pre-season tour squad due to a dispute over assurances of playing time in a new contract. It was subsequently reported that Sancho was attempting to engineer a move away from the club and City were alarmed at Sancho's attitude after he missed training following a pre-season tour.

Borussia Dortmund

2017–2019
Sancho signed for German Bundesliga club Borussia Dortmund on 31 August 2017 for a fee reported to be in the region of £8 million and was immediately included in the first-team squad. He later stated that he felt confident in making the move abroad due to his previous experiences in relocating with Watford and Manchester City. Sancho made his debut for the club against Eintracht Frankfurt on 21 October, coming on as a substitute with six minutes left of the match, becoming the first Englishman to play a Bundesliga match for Dortmund. Sancho made his first league start for Dortmund on 14 January 2018, hitting the woodwork in a goalless draw with VfL Wolfsburg. He scored his first professional goal on 21 April. It was the first goal in a 4–0 victory against Bayer Leverkusen in the Bundesliga and he also assisted two other goals in the same match.

Having signed a new contract keeping him at the club until 2022, Sancho enjoyed a successful October 2018 by being named Bundesliga Player of the Month, registering three goals and an assist in just three league games. Included among his goals for the month was a brace in a draw against Hertha BSC which saw him become the first player born in the 2000s to score twice in a single Bundesliga match and the youngest ever by a Dortmund player. On 24 October, he also became the first player born in the 2000s to score in the UEFA Champions League for Dortmund against Atlético Madrid.

During a 3–3 draw with 1899 Hoffenheim on 9 February 2019, he became the youngest-ever player to score eight goals in a single Bundesliga season, breaking the record previously held by Christian Wück. Later that month, upon scoring in a 3–2 win over Bayer Leverkusen, he broke Lukas Podolski's record to become the youngest player to score nine Bundesliga goals, aged 18 years and 336 days. On 13 April, Sancho scored a brace in a 2–1 win over Mainz 05 and in doing so became the youngest-ever Dortmund player to score at least 10 goals in a single Bundesliga campaign. Following an impressive league campaign in which he scored 12 goals and provided 14 assists, Sancho was named in the 2018–19 Bundesliga Team of the Season.

2019–2021
Success continued ahead of the 2019–20 season, with Sancho providing an assist and scoring in a 2–0 DFL-Supercup victory over Bayern Munich on 3 August 2019. Later that month Sancho agreed a new contract with Dortmund. In November, he was named runner-up in the Golden Boy award. The next month, he was named runner-up in the Kopa Trophy award. Sancho's goal in Dortmund's 3–3 draw with RB Leipzig on 17 December meant he had scored in seven consecutive games for the club (including in Champions League matches against Barcelona and Slavia Prague), bringing his tally up to 15 goals and 16 assists in the Bundesliga in the calendar year of 2019. Sancho's three goals and three assists in five league matches during February 2020 saw him named Bundesliga Player of the Month for the second time in his career.

On 31 May 2020, Sancho scored his first career hat-trick in a 6–1 away win over SC Paderborn. After scoring his first goal, he removed his shirt to reveal a shirt with the message "Justice for George Floyd", a black man who was murdered earlier that week in Minneapolis by a police officer, who knelt on Floyd's neck until he became unresponsive.

On 13 May 2021, Sancho scored a two goals in a 4–1 win over RB Leipzig in the 2021 DFB-Pokal Final.

Manchester United

On 1 July 2021, it was announced that Manchester United and Dortmund had reached an agreement for Sancho's transfer, subject to him signing a contract and passing a medical, both of which were expected to happen after UEFA Euro 2020. The transfer was completed on 23 July, after Sancho signed a five-year contract with the option of a further year. He was given the number 25 shirt last worn by Odion Ighalo. On 14 August, he made his debut as a substitute for Daniel James in a 5–1 home league win over rivals Leeds United. On 23 November, he scored his first goal for the club, against Villarreal to secure a spot in the knockout stage of the Champions League. Five days later he scored his first Premier League goal against Chelsea after Jorginho miscontrolled a long clearance from Bruno Fernandes, allowing Sancho to take advantage of a two-on-one with Édouard Mendy.

Sancho scored his first goal of the 2022–23 season in a 2–1 home victory over Liverpool on 22 August 2022. On 1 February 2023, he played in the EFL Cup semi-final second leg match against Nottingham Forest, his first match since October 2022, as his team secured a place in the final. A week later, he came off the bench to score the equalising goal in a 2–2 draw at home to Leeds United.

International career

Youth career
Sancho was capped by England's youth teams at under-16, under-17 and under-19 levels.

In May 2017, Sancho was part of the England under-17 team that reached the final of the UEFA European Under-17 Championship, and was named player of the tournament for his performances. In September 2017, Sancho was named in England's squad for the 2017 FIFA U-17 World Cup but the player's new German club resisted the call up. The two parties eventually reached an agreement where he would be available for the group stages of the competition, but his participation was not guaranteed if England progressed to the knock out rounds. On 8 October 2017, he scored twice in England U17's first match, against Chile. On 16 October, during England's round of 16 tie against Japan, he was withdrawn from the competition by Borussia Dortmund.

On 2 November 2017, Sancho was called up to the England U19 squad for the first time, joining them for 2018 UEFA European Under-19 Championship qualification matches against the Faroe Islands, Iceland and Group 8's host-nation team Bulgaria. He made his first start at U19 level in the 6–0 victory against the Faroes, lasting seventy minutes before being substituted for Ben Brereton Díaz; He replaced Brereton in the 66th minute in the win over Iceland, which secured progression to the elite round. He scored the only goal of the match against Bulgaria to help England top their group. Coming on as a substitute for Brereton, Sancho scored the last of the goals in England's 4–1 win over Hungary in the first match of the elite round on 21 March 2018.

Senior career
Following an impressive start to the 2018–19 season, Sancho was called up to the England senior squad for the first time on 4 October 2018 in preparation for UEFA Nations League fixtures against Croatia and Spain. He made his debut as a 78th-minute substitute against Croatia on 12 October, in a 0–0 away draw. On 22 March 2019, Sancho started his first competitive match for England in their 5–0 win over the Czech Republic at Wembley Stadium for a UEFA Euro 2020 qualifying match. During the September internationals, Sancho scored his debut goals for the senior team, a brace, in a 5–3 home victory over Kosovo in a Euro 2020 qualifier on 10 September.

On 11 July 2021, Sancho was brought on as a 120th-minute substitute for Kyle Walker during the UEFA Euro 2020 Final against Italy. He took England's fourth penalty in the subsequent shoot-out, which was saved by Gianluigi Donnarumma. Following the 3–2 loss on penalties, Sancho along with Marcus Rashford and Bukayo Saka (who also missed penalties) were subjected to racially abusive messages on social media.

Sancho was not included in England's squad for the 2022 FIFA World Cup.

Style of play
Sancho can function as a second striker or wide midfielder typically in a Borussia Dortmund 4–2–3–1 formation on either wing of attack. Dortmund's "young player project" helped Sancho function in the focal point of attack alongside a core of talented young stars like Erling Haaland, Gio Reyna and Jude Bellingham.

Regarded as a quick, highly technical, and creative player, with excellent dribbling skills and ball control, Sancho is known for his trickery and use of feints in one-on-one situations and has been described as one of the world's best young players. Although he is known in particular for his ability to get past opponents and create chances for teammates, he is also capable of scoring goals himself.

Career statistics

Club

International

England score listed first, score column indicates score after each Sancho goal

Honours
Borussia Dortmund
DFB-Pokal: 2020–21
DFL-Supercup: 2019

Manchester United
EFL Cup: 2022–23

England U17
FIFA U-17 World Cup: 2017
UEFA European Under-17 Championship runner-up: 2017

England
UEFA European Championship runner-up: 2020
UEFA Nations League third place: 2018–19

Individual
UEFA European Under-17 Championship Golden Player: 2017
UEFA European Under-17 Championship Team of the Tournament: 2017
Bundesliga Player of the Month: October 2018, February 2020, February 2021
Bundesliga Goal of the Month: February 2019
Bundesliga Team of the Season: 2018–19, 2019–20
kicker Bundesliga Team of the Season: 2018–19, 2019–20
VDV Newcomer of the Season: 2018–19
VDV Team of the Season: 2018–19, 2019–20
Goal.com NxGn: 2019
DFB-Pokal top scorer: 2020–21

References

External links

Profile at the Manchester United website
Profile at the Football Association website

2000 births
Living people
Footballers from Camberwell
People from Kennington
Footballers from the London Borough of Lambeth
English footballers
Association football wingers
Watford F.C. players
Manchester City F.C. players
Borussia Dortmund II players
Borussia Dortmund players
Manchester United F.C. players
Regionalliga players
Bundesliga players
Premier League players
England youth international footballers
England international footballers
UEFA Euro 2020 players
English expatriate footballers
Expatriate footballers in Germany
English expatriate sportspeople in Germany
Black British sportsmen
English people of Trinidad and Tobago descent
Footballers educated at St Bede's College, Manchester